Mongolia–Russia relations have been traditionally strong since the Communist era, when the Soviet Union supported the Mongolian People's Republic. Mongolia and Russia remain allies in the post-communist era. Russia has an embassy in Ulaanbaatar and two consulates general (in Darkhan and Erdenet). Mongolia has an embassy in Moscow, three consulates general (in Irkutsk, Kyzyl and Ulan Ude), and a branch in Yekaterinburg. Both countries are full members of the Organization for Security and Co-operation in Europe (Russia is a participating state, while Mongolia is a partner).

According to a 2017 survey, 90% of Mongolians have a favorable view of Russia (38% "strongly" and 52% "somewhat" favorable), with 8% expressing a negative view (2% "strongly" and 6% "somewhat" unfavorable).

Background

Russia and Mongolia share a 3,500-kilometer border.  When Chinese forces attacked Mongolia in 1919 to negate its independence from China, the Russian Asiatic Cavalry Division commanded by Roman von Ungern-Sternberg helped Mongolia ward off the invasion.
The Mongolian People's Republic was established in 1921 with Soviet military support and under Soviet influence.

Soviet Union and the Mongolian People's Republic

The Soviet Union supported the Mongolian Revolution of 1921 which brought the Mongolian People's Party (later the Mongolian People's Revolutionary Party) to power as the ruling party of the Mongolian People's Republic (MPR), established in 1924. Over the next seventy years, Mongolia "pursued policies in imitation of the devised by the USSR" as a Soviet satellite state. Mongolian supreme leader Khorloogiin Choibalsan, acting under Soviet instructions, carried out a mass terror from 1936 to 1952 (see Stalinist repressions in Mongolia), with the greatest number of arrests and executions (targeting in particular the Buddhist clergy) occurring between September 1937 and November 1939. Soviet influences pervaded Mongolian culture throughout the period, and schools through the nation, as well as the National University of Mongolia, emphasized Marxism-Leninism. Nearly every member of the Mongolian political and technocratic elite, as well as many members of the cultural and artistic elite, were educated in the USSR or one of its Eastern European allies.  The Mongolian economy was heavily reliant on the Soviet bloc for electric power, trade, and investment. The MPR collapsed in 1990 and the first democratically elected government took office the same year, leading to "a wedge in the previously close relationship between Mongolia and the Soviet bloc." After 1992, Russian technical aid stopped, and Russia made a request to Mongolia to pay back all the aid which it had received from the Soviet Union from 1946 to 1990, a figure which the Soviets estimated at 11.6 billion transferable roubles (disputed by the Mongolians).

The communist regimes of Mongolia and the USSR forged close bilateral relations and cooperation. Both nations established close industrial and trade links, especially with the Soviet republics in Central Asia and Mongolia consistently supported the Soviet Union on international issues. Mongolia sought Russian aid to allay fears of Chinese expansionism and a large number of Soviet forces were permanently deployed in Mongolia. In 1986, both countries signed a treaty of peace, friendship and cooperation. Mongolia sided with the Soviet Union following the Sino-Soviet split in the 1950s. Following the example of Soviet leader Mikhail Gorbachev's policy of improving ties with the West and China, Mongolia improved its relations with the United States and China. In 1989, Mongolia and the Soviet Union finalized plans for the withdrawal of Soviet troops from Mongolia.

Contemporary times

Following the dissolution of the Soviet Union and the end of the Cold War, Mongolia's trade with Russia declined by 80% and China's relations and influence over Mongolia increased. However, Russia has sought to rebuild strong relations with Mongolia in recent years to enhance its standing as a regional power. In 2000, then Russian President Vladimir Putin made a landmark visit to Mongolia —the first by a Russian head of state since Leonid Brezhnev in 1974 and one of the first of Putin's presidency— and renewed a major bilateral treaty. The visit and improvement in bilateral relations was popularly welcomed in Mongolia as countering China's influence. Russia lowered  the prices of oil and energy exports to Mongolia and enhanced cross-border trade. The Russian government wrote off 98% of Mongolia's state debt and an agreement was signed to build an oil pipeline from Russia to China through Mongolia.

In September 2022, Russian President Vladimir Putin attended the  military exercise in the Russian Far East. Beyond Russian troops, the exercises also included military forces from Mongolia, among others. 

Most prominent economic collaboration between Russia and Mongolia is the Power of Siberia 2 natural gas pipeline, construction of which is expected to begin in 2024. The planned 2,600 km pipeline connecting Russia and China via Mongolia will have a capacity of 50 billion cubic meters of gas per year and could be operational by 2030, generating transit fees and gas supplies for Mongolia.

State visits

From Soviet and Russian leaders to Mongolia
Leonid Brezhnev (13-15 January 1966)
Leonid Brezhnev (November 1974)
Vladimir Putin (2000)
Dmitry Medvedev (2-3 September 2009)
Vladimir Putin (2-3 September 2014)
Vladimir Putin (2-3 September 2019)

From Mongolian leaders to Russia 
Damdin Sükhbaatar (1921)
Punsalmaagiin Ochirbat (1993)
Natsagiin Bagabandi (1999)
Natsagiin Bagabandi (9 May 2005)
Nambaryn Enkhbayar (2006)
Nambaryn Enkhbayar (2008)
Tsakhiagiin Elbegdorj (9 May 2010)
Tsakhiagiin Elbegdorj (31 May 2011)
Tsakhiagiin Elbegdorj (9 May 2015)
Khaltmaagiin Battulga (7 September 2017)

Gallery

See also
Battle of Kulikovo
Foreign relations of Mongolia
Foreign relations of Russia
Mongolia–Russia border
Mongol invasion of Kievan Rus'

References

External links

  Documents on the Mongolia–Russia relationship at the Russian Ministry of Foreign Affairs

Diplomatic missions
  Embassy of Russia in Ulan Batar
  Embassy of Mongolia in Moscow

 
Russia
Bilateral relations of Russia